Trader Horn is a 1973 Metrocolor film directed by Reza Badiyi and starring Rod Taylor as the African adventurer Trader Horn. It is a remake of the 1931 film, also released by Metro-Goldwyn-Mayer.

Plot
During World War I, Alfred Aloysius "Trader" Horn leads an expedition in search of a platinum mine in an unexplored region of Africa. The trio encounter warring natives, rhinos and lions. They travel through jungle, swamps, and desert. They are pursued by German soldiers wanting the platinum for the war effort and by a British officer hunting Horn as a traitor.

Cast
 Rod Taylor as Alfred Aloysius "Trader" Horn
 Anne Heywood as Nicole Mercer
 Jean Sorel as Emil DuMond
 Don Knight as Colonel Sinclair
 Ed Bernard as Apague
 Stack Pierce as Malugi
 Erik Holland as Lt. Medford
 Robert Miller Driscoll as Alfredo
 Solomon Karriem as Red Sun
 Ji-Tu Cumbuka as Orange Stripe
 Willie Harris as Blue Star
 Caro Kenyatta as Umbopa
 Oliver Givens as Dancer
 Curt Lowens as Schmidt
 John Siegfried as German Officer

Production
The film was primarily shot on the backlot at the Metro-Goldwyn-Mayer studios in Culver City, California.  The script, set during the First World War ignores the plot of the 1931 film about the discovery of a white jungle queen. The new story is written to use colourised footage from the MGM films King Solomon's Mines (1950), and Mogambo (1953).
Rod Taylor felt, with the end of the Vietnam War, the time was right for old-fashioned hero movies to make a comeback.

Rod Taylor performed his own stunt riding on a zebra in the picture, actually taming the animal in the process.

See also
 List of American films of 1973

References

External links
 
 
 
 
 Trader Horn at New York Times
 Trader Horn at the Rod Taylor Site

1973 films
Metro-Goldwyn-Mayer films
1970s historical adventure films
Films set in Africa
Films set in 1916
Trader Horn
Films shot in the Democratic Republic of the Congo
American World War I films
World War I films set in Africa
American historical adventure films
Remakes of American films
1970s English-language films
1970s American films